Kenny Segal (born December 3, 1979), also known as Syndakit, is an American record producer and DJ based in Los Angeles, California. In 2018, Mixmag described him as "one of the best hip-hop producers in the city." He has been a member of Team Supreme, The Kleenrz, and The Jefferson Park Boys.

Early life
Kenny Segal was born and raised in Rockville, Maryland. He played cello in school orchestras. He attended University of Southern California on a computer engineering scholarship. Subsequently, he changed his major to audio recording.

Career
Kenny Segal originally played drum and bass at the Konkrete Jungle party in the 1990s. At Konkrete Jungle, he met rappers from the Project Blowed collective. After being inspired by Los Angeles' underground rap scene, he eventually switched to hip hop. He was one of the first musicians to perform at the Low End Theory party.

In 2008, Kenny Segal released Ken Can Cook. A concept album based around food and cooking, it included guest appearances from Abstract Rude, Aceyalone, Myka 9, and P.E.A.C.E., among others. In 2018, he released Happy Little Trees. Bandcamp Daily included it on the "Best Beat Tapes of 2018" list. In 2019, he released a collaborative album with Billy Woods, titled Hiding Places, as well as a collaborative album with Hemlock Ernst, titled Back at the House.

Discography

Studio albums
 3080 Flux (2002) 
 Ken Can Cook (2008)
 The Kleenrz (2012) 
 Season 2 (2016) 
 Happy Little Trees (2018)
 Hiding Places (2019) 
 Back at the House (2019) 
 Ajai (2020) 
 Indoors (2021)

Compilation albums
 Kenstrumentalz Vol. 1: Look What I Found Under Kenny's Couch (2013)
 Kenstrumentals Vol. 2: Summer Rarities (2016)
 Kenstrumentals Vol. 3: Travelog (2018)

EPs
 It's All Math (2014)
 Casual Horns, Dog (2018)

Singles
 "Big Business" (2015) 
 "Ajai Epilogue" (2020)

Productions
 Haiku d'Etat - "Coup de Theatre" from Coup de Theatre (2004)
 P.E.A.C.E. - Megabyte (2004)
 Aceyalone - "Grand Imperial" from Grand Imperial (2006)
 The Blacklove Radiators - Memoirs of Planet Lovetron (2008)
 Freestyle Fellowship - "Ambassadors" and "Gimmee" from The Promise (2011)
 Busdriver - "Eat Rich" and "Go Hard or Go Homogenous" from Perfect Hair (2014)
 Open Mike Eagle - "Idaho" from Dark Comedy (2014)
 Busdriver - "Much" and "Worlds to Run" from Thumbs (2015)
 Milo - So the Flies Don't Come (2015)
 Armand Hammer - "Pergamum" from Rome (2017)
 Milo - "Magician (Suture)", "The Young Man Has a Point (Nurture)", "Paging Mr. Bill Nun", "Sorcerer", "Yet Another", "Embroidering Machine", and "Rapper" from Who Told You to Think??!!?!?!?! (2017)
 Open Mike Eagle - "No Selling (Uncle Butch Pretending It Don't Hurt)" from Brick Body Kids Still Daydream (2017)
 Armand Hammer - "Alternate Side Parking" and "ECOMOG" from Paraffin (2018)
 Busdriver - "I Been There" from Electricity Is on Our Side (2018)
 Milo - "Mythbuilding Exercise No.9", "Deposition Regarding the Green Horse for Rap", and "Thinking While Eating a Handful of Almonds" from Budding Ornithologists Are Weary of Tired Analogies (2018)
 The Grouch - "Procrastination" from Unlock the Box (2018)
 Self Jupiter - "Window Seat" from S*xy Beast (2019)
 Armand Hammer - "Dead Cars" from Shrines (2020)
 R.A.P. Ferreira - Purple Moonlight Pages (2020)
 Serengeti - KDxMPC (2020)
 Elucid - "Jumanji" from I Told Bessie (2022)
R.A.P Ferreira - "mythsysizer instinct" from 5 to the Eye with Stars(2022)

References

External links
 
 

1979 births
Living people
University of Southern California alumni
American hip hop record producers